Glenflesk is a small village in County Kerry, Ireland. It is located on the N22 national primary route between Cork and Killarney.

The local Roman Catholic church is dedicated to Saint Agatha and was built . Glenflesk is in the Roman Catholic Diocese of Kerry. Glenflesk National School is a co-educational primary (national) school which had 34 pupils enrolled as of the 2020 school year. The local Gaelic Athletic Association club, Glenflesk GAA, fields Gaelic football teams in the East Kerry Division.

References

Towns and villages in County Kerry